Grazia Barcellona (22 January 1929 – 2 October 2019) was an Italian figure skater. She competed in two events at the 1948 Winter Olympics.

References

1929 births
2019 deaths
Italian female single skaters
Italian female pair skaters
Olympic figure skaters of Italy
Figure skaters at the 1948 Winter Olympics
Figure skaters from Milan